The Central Interstate Low Level Radioactive Waste Compact is made up of the states of Louisiana, Arkansas, Oklahoma, and Kansas. The compact was established by the "Compact Law" and the "Low-Level Radioactive Waste Policy Amendments of the 1985." 

The Central Interstate Low Level Radioactive Waste Compact and US Ecology purchased land 2 miles west of Butte, Nebraska in the early 1990s with the intention of placing a dump site there. There was extensive controversy and the dump site was eventually removed from consideration. 

Citizens and factions throughout Boyd County, where Butte is located, fought for over 15 years over the placement of a disposal site in this area. Nebraska governors Kay Orr and Ben Nelson were heavily involved on different sides of the issue. 

Nebraska was officially removed from the compact after a series of long court battles that ended in 2004. The state of Nebraska had to pay a settlement and there have been attempts made to sell the compact's land just outside Butte.

References

Radioactive waste